The Transbaikal electoral district was a constituency created for the 1917 Russian Constituent Assembly election. The electoral district covered the Transbaikal Oblast. 6 out of the 15 submitted lists in Transbaikal were rejected by the electoral authorities.

In Transbaikal the local Bolshevik party organization had steered away from the party centre, and cooperated with the local Mensheviks and Socialist-Revolutionaries. In May 1917 the three parties had a joint list for the local government election. As of July 1917 Bolsheviks and Mensheviks were still holding joint meetings in Chita. The city was ruled by a People's Soviet, gathering SRs (both right and left-wing factions), Mensheviks and Bolsheviks. Only in the immediate run-up to the October Revolution was an All-Siberian Executive Bureau of the Bolshevik Party formed and the Siberian Bolsheviks began to conform with the party line.

Results

Rupen (1964) lists largely similar results as Radkey, but with different totals for the Union of Transbaikal Old Believers (176 votes) and instead of the Popular Socialists he mentions a "Barguzin Branch, RSDRP" with 1,248 votes. He refers to the Mensheviks as "Chita Branch, RSDRP [Mensheviks]".

References

Electoral districts of the Russian Constituent Assembly election, 1917